St Joseph's Roman Catholic High School and Sports College is a voluntary aided comprehensive school located in Horwich, Greater Manchester, England. It is under trusteeship of the Roman Catholic Diocese of Salford and is maintained by Bolton Metropolitan Borough Council.

The school is in the top 4 schools (three of which are faith schools) at GCSE in the Metropolitan Borough of Bolton. On 2 June 2020, the school was formally admitted as a member to the worldwide UNESCO Associated Schools Network.

Admissions
 the school had 856 pupils within the age range of 11-16. The school is in the trusteeship of the Diocese of Salford, established in 1963.

Headteachers
1963–1975: Mr. John B. Yates
1975–1991: Mr. G. Eric Hester
1991–1995: Mr. Gerard F. Boyle
1995–2013: Mr. Leo F. Conley
2013–2017: Mr. Richard Woods
2017–present: Mr. Tony McCabe

Deputy Headteachers
1967–1993: Mr. Brian Brady
1993–2004: Mr. Len Gee
2004–2007: No appointed deputy (four teachers were assistant headteachers)
2007–2018: Mr. Maurice Graham
2018–present: Mrs J Morgan
2018–present: Mrs N Yorke Robinson

Chairs of Governing Body
1963–1966: Rev. Fr. P. J. Veale
1966–1975: Rev. Fr. B. O'Leary
1975–1980: Rev. Fr. Moriarty
1980–1985: Rev. Fr. B. Pilling
1985–2012: Rev. Canon H. Jones
2012–2019: Mr W. Charnley
2019–present: Mrs Patricia Jones

Aims and Mission Statement 
In 2018 governors, staff, students, parents and carers reviewed the school's mission and devised the following mission statement to reflect the work of St Joseph's. Students were keen to make the mission statement an acrostic poem using ‘Joeys’ as the lead word.

Jesus Christ is the school family role model.

Opening our hearts and minds to dream the impossible and achieve beyond our wildest imagination.

Everybody is valued, nurtured and respected.

Young and old will journey together to build God’s Kingdom.

Striving for academic excellence and celebrating success in all we do.

Academic life 
Subjects available at GCSE and above are:

 Art (GCSE)
 Biology (GCSE)
 Business Studies (GCSE)
 Chemistry (GCSE)
 Computer Science (GCSE)
 Design & Technology (GCSE)
 Drama (GCSE)
 English Language (GCSE)
 English Literature (GCSE)
 Food Technology
 Geography (GCSE)
 Health & Social Studies
 History (GCSE)
 ICT (GCSE)
 iMedia (OCR Cambridge Nationals)
 Mathematics (GCSE)
 Modern Languages - French, Spanish (GCSE) 
 Music
 Sports Science
 Physics (GCSE)
 Religious Studies (GCSE)
 Textiles (GCSE)
 Award in Statistical Methods (level 3)

Curriculum Enrichment 
St. Joseph’s, believe that education is not purely academic and highlight the importance of nurturing children to become responsible, dynamic young people who can achieve academically and have the life skills that can be used in the workplace maintaining a Catholic ethos, in their future lives as adult Christians.

In addition to the many academic lessons and activities, St Joseph's has a number of enrichment programmes that anyone can get involved with. St Joseph’s enjoys a rich and vibrant extra-curricular programme which plays a vital role in building confidence and deepening personalities. These range from sporting clubs and fixtures through to Be Kind to Your Mind and the School Mission Team.

They also provide many opportunities for residential and day visits, including retreats to Savio House, Duke of Edinburgh expeditions, sporting trips to Jesolo in Italy, the ski course to Austria and an annual pupil exchange to Spain.

Other extra-curricular activities available at St Joseph's include:

 Drama
 Craft Club
 Baking Club
 Film Club
 Music Drop-in
 Science Club
 STEM Club
 Astronomy Club
 Eco-Warriors
 Creative Writing
 Philosophical Thinkers
 Bar Modelling Master Class
 Puzzle Club
 Chess Club

Infrastructure Developments 
The new £3,000,000 wing of the school, was opened during the summer term of 2020. This created the capacity for a further 10 classrooms, 2 ICT rooms, a large library and drama studio.

Work continued on the new development throughout the COVID-19 lockdown period.

COVID-19 Contingencies 
Following government advice, St Joseph's has remained open for the children of key workers. Education provision has continued through the setting of work through the school ePraise system and regular contact between teaching staff and students. The school is continuing its pastoral care through weekly welfare phone calls, engaging through emails, YouTube videos and a new Alexa skill called 'Joey's Thrive.'

On 4 June 2020, St Joseph's was awarded the Teach Well School Gold Award from the Teach Well Alliance in recognition of the work it undertook to take care of the physical and mental wellbeing of its staff and students during the coronavirus pandemic.

Notable Joey's 
People who are connected to the school community in any way are  affectionately known as ‘Joeys’. To be a ‘Joey’ means to represent the school mission.

The school informal motto is, ‘Once a Joey, always a Joey’.

Notable JOEYs are:

Vernon Kay, British TV presenter
Monty Lord, World memory champion (5 Guinness World Records) and bestselling author
Phil Clarke, Great Britain Rugby league captain and Sky Sports commentator
Peter Anglesea, Sale Sharks rugby union former captain and head coach
Sean Long, former rugby league footballer, most notable for playing for St. Helens
Charlie Bowling, Commonwealth Games bronze medalist (Team England), Olympic Wrestling
Jordan Flores, footballer (Bohemians FC)
Adam Senior, footballer (Bolton Wanderers FC)
Peter Morrison, footballer and then an agent following retirement

References

External links
 Official website
 EduBase
 Joey's Thrive channel
 Joey's Thrive Skill

Secondary schools in the Metropolitan Borough of Bolton
Catholic secondary schools in the Diocese of Salford
Voluntary aided schools in England
Horwich